The  was an infantry division in the Imperial Japanese Army.

It was created 15 June 1944 in Mindanao under command of Lieutenant-General Jiro Harada. The nucleus for the formation was the 30th Independent Mixed Brigade and reinforcements sent from Moji 29 May 1944. It was a type C(hei) security division.

Action
The 100th division was assigned to the 35th army upon formation. It garrisoned a large area of Mindanao island centering at Davao. In the course of the Battle of Davao since 27 April 1945, the 100th division was squeezed to the mountains north-west of Davao and survived until news of the surrender of Japan reached it 18 August 1945. The division officially surrendered to US forces on the 7th of September, 1945.

See also
 List of Japanese Infantry Divisions
 Independent Mixed Brigades (Imperial Japanese Army)

References and further reading

 Madej, W. Victor. Japanese Armed Forces Order of Battle, 1937-1945 [2 vols] Allentown, PA: 1981
This article incorporates material from the article 第100師団 (日本軍) in the Japanese Wikipedia, retrieved on 24 June 2016.

Japanese World War II divisions
Infantry divisions of Japan
Military units and formations established in 1944
Military units and formations disestablished in 1945
1944 establishments in Japan
1945 disestablishments in Japan